The Queen of Orkney, today best known as Morgause  and also known as Morgawse and other spellings and names, is a character in later Arthurian traditions. In some versions of the legend, including the seminal text Le Morte d'Arthur, she is the mother of Gawain and Mordred, both key players in the story of King Arthur and his downfall. Mordred is the offspring of Arthur's accidental incest with Morgause, the king's estranged half-sister. She is furthermore a sister of Morgan le Fay and the wife of King Lot of Orkney, as well as the mother of Gareth, Agravain, and Gaheris, the last of whom murders her.

Earlier counterparts
The corresponding character in Geoffrey of Monmouth's 12th-century Anglo-Norman Latin chronicle Historia Regum Britanniae is named Anna who is depicted as the sole daughter of Uther Pendragon and his wife Igraine, thus making her Arthur's full sister. In Wolfram von Eschenbach's Parzival, Anna is replaced by Sangive, whom German poet Der Pleier calls Seife. They are usually cast in the role of Lot's wife and Gawain's mother. Gawain is usually given various sisters. In Parzival, he also has a brother named Beacurs.

The mother of Gawain's Welsh forerunner, Gwalchmei ap Gwyar, is thought to be Gwyar. In later Welsh Arthurian literature, Gawain is considered synonymous with the native champion Gwalchmei; Gwyar (meaning "gore" or "spilled blood/bloodshed") is likely the name of Gwalchmei's mother, rather than his father as is the standard in the Welsh Triads. (Matronyms were sometimes used in Wales, as in the case of Math fab Mathonwy and Gwydion fab Dôn, and were also fairly common in early Ireland.) Gwyar is named as a female, a daughter of Amlawdd Wledig, in one version of the hagiographical genealogy Bonedd y Saint, while the 14th-century Birth of Arthur substitutes Gwyar for Geoffrey's Anna as Gwalchmei/Gawain's mother. Other sources do not follow this substitution, however, indicating that Gwyar and Anna/Morgause originated independently.

Medieval literature
The earliest known form of a Morgause-type name is Orcades (Norcadés), given to her in the First Continuation of Chrétien de Troyes' Perceval (the former of which was once attributed to Wauchier de Denain and dated c. 1200). In the works by Chrétien and his continuators, she features as the mother of her sons Gawain, Agravain, Gaheris, Gareth and Mordred, and her daughters include Clarissant and Soredamor. As Morcades (Morchades, Orchades), she also appears in Les Enfances Gauvain (early 13th century) and again in Heinrich von dem Türlin's Diu Crône (c. 1230). It is likely that her name was originally a place name, as "Orcades" coincides with the Latin name for the Orkney Islands, the land traditionally ruled by Gawain's parents. Medievalist Roger Sherman Loomis suggests that this toponym was corrupted into the variants of "Morcades" and finally "Morgause" due to the influence of the name "Morgan".

Her parallel in the vast Vulgate Cycle from the early 13th century is named Brimesent (with manuscript variant Hermesent), who in turn is called  Belisent in the late 13th-century Arthour and Merlin and Albagia in the 15th-century Italian compilation La Tavola Ritonda. Der Pleier's 13th-century German Meleranz named the parents of Gaheris (but not Gawain, whose mother is Seife) as the King of Gritenland and Arthur's sister Anthonje. In the French romance tradition considered to have began with Merlin by Robert de Boron around 1200, she is one of a number of Arthur's half-sisters. Her parents are Gorlois of Tintagel, Duke of Cornwall, and his wife Lady Igraine (Arthur's future mother). In the Post-Vulgate Cycle evolution of Robert's tale, she is referred to only as the queen of Orkney without any given name.

Le Morte d'Arthur and its sources
In Thomas Malory's 1485 compilation of Arthurian legends Le Morte d'Arthur, Morgause (also Morgawse or Margawse) is one of three daughters born to Duke Gorlois and Lady Igraine. According to Malory, following his French prose cycles, their mother is widowed by, and then remarried to, the high king Uther Pendragon (Arthur's father). Afterwards, she and her younger sisters, Elaine and Morgan ("le Fay", later the mother of Yvain), now Uther's foster daughters, are married off to allies or vassals of their stepfather. The young Morgause is wed to the Orcadian King Lot and bears him four sons, all of whom later go on to serve Arthur as key members of the Knights of the Round Table. They are Gawain, one of Arthur's greatest and closest companions with a darker side; Agravain, secretly a wretched and twisted traitor; Gaheris, a skilled fighter but troubled man; and finally the youngest Gareth, a gentle and loving good knight to whom Malory dedicates one of his work's eight parts (The Book of Gareth of Orkney).

Morgause's husband King Lot joins the failed rebellions against Arthur that follow in the wake of King Uther's death and the subsequent discovery and coronation of his heir. Acting as a spy during the war, she comes to Carleon where she visits the boy King Arthur, ignorant of their familial relationship, in his bedchamber and they conceive Mordred. Her husband, who has unsuspectingly raised Mordred as his own son, is later slain in battle by King Pellinore. All of her sons depart their father's court to take service at Camelot, where Gawain and Gaheris avenge Lot's death by killing Pellinore, thereby launching a long blood feud between the two families that contributes in bringing the ruin to Arthur's kingdom.

Nevertheless, Morgause has an affair with Sir Lamorak, a son of Pellinore and one of Arthur's best knights. One time, Lancelot and Bleoberis even find Lamorak and Meleagant fighting over which queen is more beautiful, Morgause or Guinevere. Eventually, her son Gaheris discovers them in flagrante together in bed while visiting her castle (the Post-Vulgate's castle Rethename in Orkney near the border with Arthur's own Logres). Enraged, he grabs Morgause by her hair and swiftly beheads her, but spares her unarmed lover (who is left naked in bed covered in her blood, and is killed later by four Orkney brothers in an unequal fight). Gaheris is consequently banished from court of Arthur (though he reappears later in the narrative, eventually being slain by Lancelot). In the original Post-Vulgate story, Gaheris' brothers Gawain and Agravain initially vow to kill him in revenge for Morgause's death until they are persuaded by Gareth and Bors to end the bloodshed in the family. Arthur buries the Queen of Orkney in the main church in Camelot, inscribing the name of her killer on it, while everyone grieves for her and condemns the "treacherous and cruel" act of Gaheris, including actually even Gaheris himself in his self-exile. In Malory's telling, however, Lancelot calls the slaying of Morgause "shameful" but Gawain seems to be angry at Gaheris only for leaving Lamorak alive at the spot. Her death was first included in the Post-Vulgate Queste; Malory used the variant from the Second Version of the Prose Tristan.

The act of Mordred's conception is described variably in the different works of Arthurian romance. In the Vulgate Merlin, the episode takes place earlier, back when the young teenage Arthur was only a mere squire to his foster-brother Kay (prior to the fateful drawing of the sword in the stone) and completely oblivious about his true heritage. During a meeting of the lords of Britain, when King Lot is out hunting, Arthur sneaks into the queen's chamber and pretends to be her husband; she eventually discovers the deception, but forgives him the next morning and agrees to keep the incident a secret between the two of them. Conversely, a flashback scene in the Post-Vulgate Merlin Continuation portrays the Queen of Orkney as entirely aware and willing in her incestous tryst with her young half-brother.

Modern fiction

In modern Arthuriana, the character of Morgause is often conflated with that of Morgan le Fay; in John Boorman's film Excalibur (1981), for instance, Morgause's role as the mother of Mordred is transferred to "Morgana". According to E. R. Huber, "What becomes clear on reading Le Morte d'Arthur and its medieval predecessors is that Morgause was not a villain until the modern period." Some modern authors such as Alfred Tennyson or Howard Pyle use the name Bellicent.

 Morgause is the title character of T.H. White's novel The Queen of Air and Darkness (1939), the second of four books in his series The Once and Future King. She hates Arthur due to his father killing her father and raping her mother and raises her children, known as the Orkney clan, to hate the Pendragons. She seduces Arthur through magic, siring Mordred. As in Malory, she is found in bed with Lamorak, but here it is Agravaine who kills her. Due to Mordred being raised by her alone, he is left damaged and hateful, blaming Arthur for his mother's death.
 In her Merlin novels (1970-1983), Mary Stewart characterizes Morgause unflatteringly as an ambitious and resentful young princess who wants to learn magic from Merlin, but he refuses her. She seduces Arthur in the hope that she can later use it against him.
 A sorceress with authority over dark powers, Morgawse is a central figure in Hawk of May (1980) and its sequel, Kingdom of Summer (1982), the first two novels in Gillian Bradshaw's Down the Long Wind series. In Kingdom of Summer, she and her husband ("King Lot of The Orcades") intrigue with King Maelgwn of Gwynedd, whom she takes as a lover.
 Marion Zimmer Bradley in her influential novel The Mists of Avalon (1983) makes Morgause a younger sister of Igraine and Viviane and aunt of Morgaine. After her niece gives birth to Mordred, Morgause adopts the newborn and rears him for Morgaine, his birth mother. In the novel's film adaptation (2001), Morgause tricks Morgaine into revealing her son's paternity, then decides to raise him as her own, thus assuming her traditional role of mother to Mordred.
 She appears in The Keltiad series (1984-1998) by American neopagan Patricia Kennealy-Morrison as the evil Marguessan, would-be usurper of the Throne of Scone and an evil twin sister of Morgan.
Morgause is the main antagonist in The Squire's Tales series (1998-2010) by Gerald Morris. She is portrayed as the latest version of "the enchantress", an evil sorceress who wishes to destroy the kings of men. She plots numerous times to kill King Arthur but is foiled in multiple books, however, she successfully seduces Arthur (who does not realize she is his half-sister) and births Mordred. In the final book she is killed by her son Gaheris, which undoes her evil spells.
 A main antagonist in the BBC television series Merlin (2008–2012), Morgause is portrayed by actress Emilia Fox as a powerful, Lady Macbeth-like sorceress. She is fiercely loyal to her half-sister Morgana, whom she seeks to make queen of Camelot.

See also 

King Arthur's family

Notes

References

Bibliography

Further reading
Thompson, Raymond H. “MORGAUSE OF ORKNEY: QUEEN OF AIR AND DARKNESS.” Quondam et Futurus 3, no. 1 (1993): 1–13. http://www.jstor.org/stable/27870220.

External links
Anna Morgause (Britannia.com)
Morgause (Robbins Library Camelot Project)
Margawse | The Legend of King Arthur (Nightbringer.se)

Arthurian characters
Female characters in literature
Female characters in television
Female literary villains
Fictional queens
Fictional witches
Incest in legend
King Arthur's family
People associated with Orkney
Witches in folklore